Tell Majdaloun is an archaeological site 1.5 km northwest of the village of the same name and 10 km southwest of Baalbek in the Beqaa Mohafazat (Governorate). It dates at least to the Early Bronze Age.

References

Baalbek District
Bronze Age sites in Lebanon